Hybolasius is a genus of longhorn beetles of the subfamily Lamiinae, containing the following species:

 Hybolasius brevicollis Broun, 1883
 Hybolasius castaneus Broun, 1893
 Hybolasius crista (Fabricius, 1775)
 Hybolasius cristatellus Bates, 1876
 Hybolasius dubius Broun, 1893
 Hybolasius fasciatus Broun, 1881
 Hybolasius femoralis Broun, 1893
 Hybolasius genalis Broun, 1903
 Hybolasius gnarus Broun, 1893
 Hybolasius gracilipes Broun, 1903
 Hybolasius lanipes Sharp, 1877
 Hybolasius laticollis Broun, 1903
 Hybolasius modestior Breuning, 1940
 Hybolasius modestus Broun, 1880
 Hybolasius optatus Broun, 1893
 Hybolasius parvus Broun, 1880
 Hybolasius pedator Bates, 1876
 Hybolasius pictitarsis Broun, 1883
 Hybolasius postfasciatus Breuning, 1940
 Hybolasius promissus Broun, 1880
 Hybolasius pumilus (Pascoe, 1876)
 Hybolasius rufescens Broun, 1893
 Hybolasius sinuatofasciatus Breuning, 1940
 Hybolasius thoracicus Broun, 1893
 Hybolasius trigonellaris Hutton, 1898
 Hybolasius vegetus Broun, 1881
 Hybolasius viridescens Bates, 1874
 Hybolasius wakefieldi Bates, 1876

incertae sedis
 Hybolasius lineiceps Broun

References

Pogonocherini
Hybolasius